Aleksandriyskaya is a rural locality (a stanitsa) and the administrative centre of Aleksandriysky Selsoviet, Kizlyarsky District, Republic of Dagestan, Russia. The population was 2,437 as of 2010. There are 13 streets.

Geography 
Aleksandriyskaya is located 42 km northeast of Kizlyar (the district's administrative centre) by road. Chernyayevka and Sangishi are the nearest rural localities.

Nationalities 
Avars, Russians, Dargins and Tabasarans live there.

References 

Rural localities in Kizlyarsky District